Julia Lebel-Arias ( Arias, born 10 March 1946) is an Argentina-born chess player and Woman International Master (WIM, 1985) who represented Argentina (until 1982), France (from 1982 till 2001) and Monaco (from 2002). She is a four-times winner of the Argentine Women's Chess Championship and a three-times winner of the French Women's Chess Championship.

Biography
From the end of 1970s to the early 1980s, Lebel-Arias was one of the leading chess players in Argentina. She won the Argentine Women's Chess Championships in four consecutive years: 1974, 1975, 1976, and 1977. After moving to France, she three times won French Women's Chess Championship: 1983, 1986, and 1990. In 1985, she was awarded the FIDE Woman International Master (WIM) title. In 1988, she won the International Women's Chess Tournament in Dortmund.

Lebel-Arias twice participated in the Women's World Chess Championship Interzonal Tournaments:
 In 1985, at Interzonal Tournament in Zheleznovodsk shared 15th-16th place with Pepita Ferrer;
 In 1987, at Interzonal Tournament in Tuzla ranked 18th place.

Lebel-Arias played for Argentina, France and Monaco in the Women's Chess Olympiads:
 In 1976, at first board in the 7th Chess Olympiad (women) in Haifa (+2, =4, -4),
 In 1978, at second board in the 8th Chess Olympiad (women) in Buenos Aires (+4, =4, -3),
 In 1980, at second board in the 9th Chess Olympiad (women) in Valletta (+3, =4, -5),
 In 1982, at third reserve board in the 10th Chess Olympiad (women) in Lucerne (+5, =2, -1),
 In 1984, at second board in the 26th Chess Olympiad (women) in Thessaloniki (+4, =5, -4),
 In 1986, at first board in the 27th Chess Olympiad (women) in Dubai (+4, =2, -6),
 In 1988, at second board in the 28th Chess Olympiad (women) in Thessaloniki (+4, =3, -3),
 In 1990, at second board in the 29th Chess Olympiad (women) in Novi Sad (+3, =2, -6),
 In 2012, at third board in the 40th Chess Olympiad (women) in Istanbul (+5, =3, -3),
 In 2014, at first board in the 41st Chess Olympiad (women) in Tromsø (+2, =3, -3),
 In 2016, at first board in the 42nd Chess Olympiad (women) in Baku (+2, =1, -6),
 In 2018, at fourth board in the 43rd Chess Olympiad (women) in Batumi (+2, =2, -5).

Lebel-Arias played for Monaco in Chess Olympiad open events:
 In 2002, at second reserve board in the 35th Chess Olympiad in Bled (+2, =1, -4),
 In 2004, at reserve board in the 36th Chess Olympiad in Calvià (+4, =5, -5),
 In 2006, at fourth board in the 37th Chess Olympiad in Turin (+4, =0, -4).

Lebel-Arias played for France in the European Team Chess Championship:
 In 1997, at first reserve board in the 2nd European Team Chess Championship (women) in Pula (+2, =2, -2).

In 2006, in Arvier, she participated in the World Senior Chess Championship in the S50 age group and ranked 8th place.

References

External links
 
 
 
 

1946 births
Living people
People from Tucumán Province
Argentine female chess players
French female chess players
Monegasque chess players
Chess Woman International Masters
Chess Olympiad competitors